Jason Evans may refer to:

 Jason Evans (photographer) (born 1968), Welsh photographer and lecturer on photography
 Jason Evans (bowls) (born 1971), South African lawn bowler
 Jason T. Evans, United States Army general